Christine Wodetzky (1940–2004) was a German film and television actress.

Partial filmography
 Ha-Dybbuk (1968) as Lea
 The Odessa File (1974) as Gisela
 To the Bitter End (1975) as Natascha Petrowna
 The Wonderful Years (1979) as Frau Bergmann
 Haus im Süden (1984) as Cecile

Television appearances
 Heinrich VIII. und seine Frauen (1968, TV Movie) as Anne Boleyn
 In einem Monat, in einem Jahr (1969, TV Movie) as Josée de Saint-Cyr
 Verraten und verkauft (1969, TV Movie) as Caroline
 Maximilian von Mexiko (1970, TV Movie) as Carlota of Mexico
 Der Kommissar (1971–1975, 2 episodes) as Charlotte Lenhard / Celia Alberti
 Marya Sklodowska-Curie (1972, TV Movie) as Marie Curie
  (1974, TV Movie) as Gertrude Rosenkranz
 Les Faucheurs de marguerites (1974) as Jeanne Dabert
 Sonderdezernat K1 (1974–1977, 2 episodes) as Inga Jensen / Heidi Schelkopf
 Derrick (1976–1993, 7 episodes) as Marie Scholz / Frau Wiesner / Frau Renzi / Frau Korda / Hanna Windorf / Elsa Hassler / Helga Hoffmann
 The Old Fox (1977–1998, 13 episodes) as Irene Gutbrod / Sonja Brandel / Regina Marbes / Waltraud Hanisch / Karin Simon / Franziska Bublin / Käte Gerstner / Franziska Kilian / Elvira Berden / Gertrud Brück / Dorothea / Vera Mathiesen / Hanni Peukert
 Ein Mann namens Parvus (1984, TV Movie) as Ekaterina
 Ein Fall für zwei: Der Versager (1985, Episode: "Der Versager") as Claudia Hassler
 Tatort (1988, Episode: "Sein letzter Wille") as Frau Liebmeier
  (1988) as Elisabeth Lorentz
 Die Männer vom K3 (1988, Episode: "Schützenfest") as Else Hausdorf
 Rothenbaumchaussee (1991, TV Movie)

References

External links
 

1940 births
2004 deaths
German film actresses
Actors from Leipzig
German television actresses
20th-century German actresses
21st-century German actresses